Steven Theunissen (born 4 May 1999) is a Dutch football player who plays as defender for GVVV.

References

1999 births
People from Oude IJsselstreek
Footballers from Gelderland
Living people
Dutch footballers
Netherlands youth international footballers
Association football defenders
Jong PSV players
GVVV players
Eerste Divisie players
Tweede Divisie players